An earthquake is the result of a sudden release of energy in the Earth's crust (the outer layer) that creates seismic waves.

Earthquake may also refer to:

Fictional characters
Earthquake (Samurai Shodown), a fictional character in the video game series Samurai Shodown

Film and TV
Earthquake (1974 film), a 1974 American film starring Charlton Heston and Ava Gardner 
Earthquake (2016 film), a 2016 Armenian film
The Earthquake, a 1985 episode of the TV sitcom Gimme a Break!
""Earthquake" (Modern Family)", a 2010 Modern Family episode
"Earthquake", a 1985 episode of the TV sitcom Night Court

Music 
Earth Quake (band), an American power pop band
Earthquake (album), a 1979 album by Electric Sun
"Earthquake" (DJ Fresh and Diplo song), 2013
"Earthquake" (Labrinth song), 2011
"Earthquake" (Lil Wayne song), 2004
"Earthquake" (Little Boots song), 2009
"Earthquake" (Mýa song), 2011
"Earfquake", a song by Tyler, the Creator
"Earthquake", a song by Family Force 5 from Business Up Front/Party in the Back
"Earthquake", a song by Tech N9ne
"Earthquake", a song by The Flirtations
"Earthquake", a song by Deerhunter from Halcyon Digest
"Earthquake", a song by The Used from Lies for the Liars
"Earthquake" (KSI song), a 2017 song by KSI featuring Ricegum

People
Earthquake (comedian) (born 1963), American stand-up comedian
Earthquake, a ringname of John Tenta, former Canadian sumo and professional wrestler (1963–2006)

Religion
 Az-Zalzala (“The Earthquake”), the ninety-ninth sura of the Qur'an

Sports and events
Earthquake (Gladiators), an event in the television series Gladiators
Earthquake: The Big One/Disaster!, a former attraction at Universal Studios Florida
San Jose Earthquakes, an American professional soccer team

Other
Earthquake map in mathematics

See also

Continental drift
Plate tectonics
Richter magnitude scale
Quake (disambiguation)